Presidential elections were held in the Maldives on 23 September 1988. Maumoon Abdul Gayoom was the sole candidate nominated by Parliament. His candidacy was approved by 96.4% of voters.

Results

References

Maldives
1988 in the Maldives
Presidential elections in the Maldives
Single-candidate elections
September 1988 events in Asia